Wenying Zhuang (July 27, 1948) is a Chinese mycologist. She is known for her contributions to the study of species diversity and phylogeny of Ascomycetes.

Early life 

Wenying Zhuang was born and raised in Beijing, China. She is the daughter of Qiaosheng Zhuang, a wheat breeder and academician of the Chinese Academy of Science.

Wenying studied Plant Pathology in Department of Agronomy at Shanxi Agricultural College (now Shanxi Agricultural University) from 1973 to 1975, and then entered Graduate School of the Chinese Academy of Sciences (CAS), where  she received a Master of Science degree in Mycology in 1985.  She continued graduate study in Mycology at  Cornell University, earning a Ph.D. in 1987, under  Richard P. Korf.

Career 
In 1975, Wenying started work as a lecturer at Shanxi Agriculture University. She was appointed as an assistant professor at the Institute of Microbiology Mycology Division of the CAS. After she received her Ph.D., she returned to China and continued her academic career on mycology in the same laboratory in the Institute of Microbiology. She worked as postdoctoral research fellow at Cornell University from July 1990 to January 1991. In 1991 she began working at the Systematic Mycology and Lichenology Laboratory of the Institute of Microbiology, CAS (now upgraded as National Key Laboratory of Mycology.

She has served as the director of Systematic Mycology and Lichenology Laboratory, Institute of Microbiology, CAS for two terms. In 2009, she was elected as a CAS Academiciana. She serves as Associate Editor-in-Chief of the Editorial Committee of Cryptogamic Flora of China, and an Editorial Board Member of international mycological journals Fungal Diversity, Mycotaxon and Phytotaxa. She is an Honorary Member of the Mycological Society of America, and Executive Committee Member of the International Mycological Association.

On October 19, 2010, Wenying was elected Third World Academy Society (TWAS) Academician in the 21st annual conference.

As a professor in CAS, she has supervised seven doctoral students and two master students.

Scientific work 

She worked on wild resource surveys, collections, and study of species diversity of certain groups of Ascomycetes through tropical and northwest areas of China, including Henan, Hubei, Yunnan, Zhejiang, Hainan, Fujian provinces and Taiwan. She continues a phylogeny study on her own collections and Institute of Microbiology specimens.

Another main contribution of her study is molecular phylogeny of Ascomycetes, between species or genera with similar anatomical structures in Otidea, Pyronemataceae, Penicillium, Nectriaceae and Helotiales, utilizing molecular bio-information methods such as ITS, 28S rDNA partial sequencing, and other nucleotide sequence analysis.

She established 9 new genera, 152 new species, and 18 new sub-species and 257 species reports found in China.

Recognition 

A genus is named in her honor: Wenyingia, in the family Pyronemataceae. It is a monotypic genus, which contains a single species, Wenyingia sichuanensis, found in western Sichuan Province.

In 1995, Wenying was awarded Third prize of Natural Science from Chinese Academy of Sciences.

Publications 

Wenying has published 180 papers, of which 97 are in SCI indexed journals. She has written and published 5 books and chapters in other 8 books so far.

Selected books

Selected articles

See also 

 List of mycologists
 Wenyingia

References

External links 

 http://www.mscas.ac.cn/Uploads/校友通讯2011-12.pdf

Living people
Cornell University College of Agriculture and Life Sciences alumni
Chinese mycologists
Biologists from Beijing
Educators from Beijing
People's Republic of China science writers
Writers from Beijing
1948 births